The 2010 Superfinalen was the second edition of Superfinalen, an annual football match between the winners of the previous season's Tippeligaen and Norwegian Cup competitions. Modeled on the FA Community Shield, the match is intended to be a season opener, with the net proceeds going to charity. It took take place on 7 March 2010, at Color Line Stadion, Ålesund, and was contested by Rosenborg and Aalesund, winners of the 2009 Tippeligaen and 2009 Norwegian Football Cup respectively. Rosenborg won the match 3–1 after leading 2–0 at halftime. Kris Stadsgaard and Rade Prica scored the goals in the first half, and Trond Olsen increased Rosenborg's lead to 3–0 before Aalesund pulled one back, courtesy of Peter Orry Larsen.

Match details

See also
2009 Tippeligaen
2009 Norwegian Football Cup

References

2010
Superfinalen
March 2010 sports events in Europe
Rosenborg BK matches
Aalesunds FK matches